Grass Roots Art & Community Effort (GRACE) is a non-profit organization based in Hardwick, Vermont, United States, that supports art-making among local community members, including the elderly and patients of mental health centers. Perhaps the most notable artist associated with GRACE is the late Gayleen Aiken. The organization maintains a permanent collection of art made in its programs. GRACE was founded in 1975 by Don Sunseri, a New York artist of the 1960s and 1970s who "escaped the insulation and sophistication of the art world," and whose credo was "Be yourself and do it your way."

References

External links

Outsider art
Arts organizations based in Vermont
Non-profit organizations based in Vermont
Arts organizations established in 1975
1975 establishments in Vermont
Hardwick, Vermont